Michael Aloysius Kozicky (born January 13, 1889 in Glen Lyon, Pennsylvania – died July 9, 1971 in Wilkes-Barre, Pennsylvania) was a major league baseball player and scout and a minor league manager.

Kozicky had a very brief major league career with the Cincinnati Reds. During the 1909 season, he was called up for two games and was used as a catcher. In the 1910 campaign, he saw action in a single game as a shortstop. In total, Kozicky had two hits in eight at bats for the major league club with a double, a run batted in and a walk.

Kozicky had a long minor league career with his best seasons coming at Reading. Playing first base for the Reading Coal Barons of the International League in 1919, he had a .335 batting average for the season. The newly renamed Reading Marines of 1920 were helped by Kozicky's stellar campaign. Now playing as a catcher, he hit .336 with 94 runs, 33 doubles, 11 triples, 22 home runs and a .575 slugging percentage.

Kozicky did some managing later in his minor league career including stints with the Virginia League Kinston Eagles and the New York–Penn League Binghamton Triplets.

Kozicky was a scout for the Philadelphia Phillies from 1961 to 1971.

External links

1889 births
1971 deaths
Allentown Dukes players
Baseball players from Pennsylvania
Binghamton Bingoes players
Binghamton Triplets managers
Binghamton Triplets players
Buffalo Bisons (minor league) players
Cincinnati Reds players
Dayton Veterans players
Jersey City Skeeters players
Louisville Colonels (minor league) players
Major League Baseball catchers
Major League Baseball shortstops
Minor league baseball managers
Philadelphia Phillies scouts
Reading Coal Barons players
Reading Marines players
Salt Lake City Bees players
Sportspeople from Wilkes-Barre, Pennsylvania
Syracuse Stars (minor league baseball) players
Toronto Maple Leafs (International League) players
Vancouver Beavers players
Wilkes-Barre Barons (baseball) players